The 2002 AAPT Championships was a men's ATP tennis tournament played on outdoor hard courts in Adelaide in Australia and was part of the International Series of the 2002 ATP Tour. It was the 25th edition of the tournament and ran from 31 December 2001 through 6 January 2002. Tim Henman won the singles title.

Finals

Singles

 Tim Henman defeated  Mark Philippoussis 6–4, 6–7(6–8), 6–3
 It was Henman's only title of the year and the 12th of his career.

Doubles

 Wayne Black /  Kevin Ullyett defeated  Bob Bryan /  Mike Bryan 7–5, 6–2
 It was Black's 1st title of the year and the 8th of his career. It was Ullyett's 1st title of the year and the 14th of his career.

References

External links
 ATP tournament profile
 ITF tournament edition details

AAPT Championships
Next Generation Adelaide International
App
2000s in Adelaide
December 2001 sports events in Australia
January 2002 sports events in Australia